The 2011 WinStar World Casino 350K was a NASCAR Camping World Truck Series event held on November 4, 2011 at the Texas Motor Speedway in Fort Worth, Texas. Contested over 148
laps of the  oval, it was the second-last race of the season, and was won by Kevin Harvick in a green-white-checker finish.

The race became notable for an incident on its fourteenth lap, where Kyle Busch deliberately spun out series regular (and championship contender) Ron Hornaday on a resulting caution after Hornaday caused Busch's truck to slide into a wall. Its aftermath affected the championship contentions of both drivers (in the Sprint Cup Series and the Camping World Truck Series respectively), and NASCAR's response to the incident also led to the first ever parking of a driver across all three races of a race weekend involving all of the association's national series since the original establishment of the Truck Series in 1995.

Report
Austin Dillon, Blake Feese, Kyle Busch and Ricky Carmichael started from the top five; Tim Andrews, Norm Benning and Derek White failed to qualify for the event.

In the race, Kevin Harvick won his fourth event of the season; Austin Dillon finished second. James Buescher ran out of fuel on a green-white-checkered finish and dropped from third to 19th. The victory saw Harvick's No. 2 Chevrolet team clinch the series' Owners Championship.

Ron Hornaday and Kyle Busch conflict
On Lap 13 after an incident with series regular and championship contender Ron Hornaday, Busch deliberately turned him into the outside wall under caution, ending Hornaday's title hopes. NASCAR black-flagged Busch, parking him from the event. The next morning, NASCAR announced that Busch would remain parked for the remainder of the weekend, including the 2011 O'Reilly Auto Parts Challenge and the 2011 AAA Texas 500. NASCAR took this action under rules that allow it to park a driver in order to ensure the "orderly conduct of the event," an action which is not appealable. Denny Hamlin and Michael McDowell stepped up to replace Busch in both the Nationwide Series and Sprint Cup series races. It was the first time since the Truck Series was launched in 1995 that NASCAR had parked a driver across all three national series, and only the third cross-series sanction in NASCAR's 64-year history. NASCAR's action mathematically eliminated Busch from contention for the Sprint Cup, though any realistic chance of him winning it ended earlier in the Chase.

Later that day, Busch issued an apology to his fans, sponsors and teammates, saying that the Texas incident was "certainly a step backward."

On November 7, NASCAR fined Busch $50,000 for "actions detrimental to stock car racing."  While the sanctioning body lifted the parking directive, it placed Busch on probation for the rest of the year, saying that he would be suspended indefinitely if he committed another action "detrimental to stock car racing or to NASCAR" or "disrupts the orderly conduct of an event".

Race results

Standings after the race

References

WinStar World Casino 350K
WinStar World Casino 350K
2010s in Fort Worth, Texas
NASCAR races at Texas Motor Speedway
NASCAR controversies